Lawrence McGettigan (25 December 1952 – January 1994) was an English professional footballer who played in the Football League for Watford as a right winger.

Personal life 
McGettigan died of a heart attack at the age of 41.

Career statistics

References

1952 births
1994 deaths
Footballers from the London Borough of Hackney
English footballers
Association football wingers
Watford F.C. players
Sandridge Rovers F.C. players
English Football League players